Prior to its uniform adoption of proportional representation in 1999, the United Kingdom used first-past-the-post for the European elections in England, Scotland and Wales. The European Parliament constituencies used under that system were smaller than the later regional constituencies and only had one Member of the European Parliament each.

The constituency of London South West was one of them.

Boundaries
1979–1984: Battersea North, Battersea South, Kingston upon Thames, Lambeth Central, Putney, Richmond (Surrey), Surbiton, Tooting, Twickenham, Vauxhall.

1984–1994: Battersea, Epsom and Ewell, Kingston upon Thames, Mitcham and Morden, Putney, Surbiton, Tooting, Wimbledon.

1994–1999: Battersea, Kingston upon Thames, Mitcham and Morden, Putney, Streatham, Surbiton, Tooting, Wimbledon.

Members of the European Parliament

Election results

Shelagh Roberts was disqualified as she was a member of the Occupational Pensions Board. She resigned from the board and contested the subsequent by-election.

References

External links
 David Boothroyd's United Kingdom Election Results

South West
20th century in London
1979 establishments in England
1999 disestablishments in England
Constituencies established in 1979
Constituencies disestablished in 1999